Jan Conn (born 1924 ) and Herb Conn (April 16, 1920 – February 1, 2012) were climbing and caving pioneers. They are credited with establishing many classic climbs in areas like Carderock in Maryland, Seneca Rocks in West Virginia, Cannon Cliff in New Hampshire and Black Hills of South Dakota. They are also well known as cave explorers who in the 1960s and 1970s discovered and mapped over 60 miles of Jewel Cave, making it the world’s third-longest cave system.

Early life and education

Both Herb and Jan were born and raised on the East Coast. Jan grew up in Maryland, just outside Washington, DC in a household with two older sisters. Jan loved music and played flute, classical guitar and several other instruments. Herb, whose full name was Herbert William Conn,  grew up in upstate New York,  in Geneva, New York, and graduated from the University of Colorado. Herb and Jan were first cousins, They married in 1944.

During World War II, Herb served as an electrical engineer for the Navy Department in Washington, DC. Jan and Herb spent their spare time exploring the rocks surrounding Washington DC, most notably Carderock where they began climbing in 1942. They climbed and named many of the routes at Carderock, including Herbie’s Horror, Jan's Face, Spider Walk and Ronnie's Leap, which was named after their dog. Herbie’s Horror, first climbed by Herb, was one of the first 5.9 routes in the eastern United States. They also made the first documented ascents of the routes Conn's East and Conn's West at Seneca Rocks, following the pitons left by the mountain troops who trained there.  In a letter to the Potomac Appalachian Trail Club Mountaineering Section the Conns describe a visit to Seneca with Don Hubbard: "Don and the two of us climbed the south peak on a gorgeous moonlit evening, carrying sleeping bags, and spent the night on the narrow summit ridge. Don woke up in the night to see the lower half of Jan’s bag flapping over the edge. But Jan was safely curled up in the top half, still anchored to a piton in the rock."  In 1944 they started publishing "Up Rope" magazine, which became the official newsletter of the Mountaineering Section of the Potomac Appalachian Trail Club (PATC).

Traveling climbers 

In 1946, Herb was discharged from the US Army and the Conns began a five-year period of traveling and climbing around the US with short forays into Canada and Mexico. They became pioneers of what is now praisingly referred to as dirtbag climbing, which they described in the We work in our spare time article: "it is a simple matter of mathematics - two people working six months a year are just as good as one person working twelve months to support two people".  They lived in a self-equipped camper converted from a ten-year-old "panel delivery truck". For several years they worked odd jobs and climbed at many locations from Yosemite in California to Mount Katahdin in Maine, making scattered first ascents along the way in places like Cannon Cliff in New Hampshire, Santa Catalina Mountains and Monument Valley in Arizona, Zion National Park in Utah, and Big Bend National Park in Texas.

Herb and Jan usually sought the easiest and most direct routes to the top of the most striking rock formations. Before the development of specialized climbing shoes, harnesses, and protection, like nuts and cams, they climbed in smooth-soled tennis shoes with 80-foot laid nylon rope tied around their waists and used pitons for protection. In the early days, many pitons were US Army issue scavenged at Seneca Rocks after World War II. They used body belays and down-climbed their routes instead of rappelling, if it was not possible to walk-off. In spite of this, they established many routes that would be challenging and often terrifying to today's climbers.

In 1947 on a trip to climb Devils Tower, the Conns passed through the Black Hills of South Dakota.  It was then that they discovered the Needles, with a seemingly unlimited quantity of excellent climbing.  They settled in the Black Hills where they made around 220 first ascents in the Needles and published a climbing guidebook to the area.  With no other climbers in the area they felt, as Herb put it, "like a couple of cats in an untended fish market."

In 1949 they bought 20 acres in the Custer area and adjacent to the Needles. A couple years after that they built a small, rustic stone home they called Conncave where they lived off the grid, without running water or electricity, for the next 60 years. To help finance their climbing and later caving adventures they created customized leather and wood products. In addition, each fall for 13 years Herb spent a week doing maintenance work filling in cracks on the four faces of Mount Rushmore, and Jan taught guitar and flute.

Caving years 

In 1959, geologist, mountaineer and caver Dwight Deal had done some exploration in a small cave called Jewel Cave, a little known monument in the National Park System. He needed some companions who might help him continue his exploration trips there and turned to his friends, Herb and Jan. He asked if they would be interested in grubbing around underground and, after thinking it over, they replied they would try it "once". That one trip turned into a passion of exploring Jewel Cave that lasted for over 22 years, and took over 6,000 volunteer hours on 700 trips. From 1959 to 1979, Herb and Jan mapped 62.36 miles of the interior of Jewel Cave. The Conns discovered what is now the Scenic Cave Tour route in 1961. The National Park Service was intrigued by their reports of high, narrow passageways, huge rooms and unusual speleothems (cave decorations) and opened a new tour route.  In addition to assisting with the construction of this trail, Herb also designed the lighting system and dramatic placement of lights still in use today. The cave winds that enticed the explorers further into the cave fascinated Herb, and in 1966 he produced an important scientific paper explaining reasons for these barometric winds. The Conn's book, "The Jewel Cave Adventure," serves not only as a record of their years of cave exploration here, but as an exciting tale of adventure even for non-cavers.

In years 1963-1965, when exploration trips into Jewel Cave were restricted, the Conns joined David Schnute exploring Wind Cave. In 1963 the trio found new passages breaking away from the known portion of the cave and allowing them to discover, name, and survey 15,740 feet of virgin passage. They largely retired from caving by the early 1980s.

Legacy

Jan's musical play, Run to Catch a Pine Cone, has been performed throughout the country. She is also an accomplished rubber stamp artist.
In a 2008 interview for Climbing Magazine they stated "I know sometimes people think we had this high dream of living like this, in a place like this … it wasn’t that way. We just kept backing away from the things we didn’t like. This is where we landed." In a 2008 talk, Jan said that they no longer climb rocks, but still enjoy the outdoors. She said, "Fortunately, the slower we move the more we see.

In summer of 1985, Herb and Jan Conn were awarded the Conservation Service Award by the Secretary of the Interior, Don Hodel.

On September 17, 2011, Herb and Jan were inducted into the South Dakota Hall of Fame in recognition of their pioneering exploration. Soon afterward Herb's health failed and on February 1, 2012, he died in sleep in his home near Custer, at the age of 91.

On 25 January 2021, their longtime home of Conncave burned to the ground, and Jan (then 97) moved into spare bedroom of her long-time friends and neighbors.

Herb was also a math enthusiast.

First ascents and significant climbs 
Most of the climbs below were done using free climbing technique without aid climbing.
Carderock in the 1940s:
 Herbie's Horror - When Herb Conn first climb it in 1942 using top-rope, it was one of the first  routes in the eastern United States.
 Leonards Lunacy - First ascent in 1945.
 Cornice - Great Falls, 1945. First ascent by Herb Conn and Sterling Hendricks.
 Conns East and Conns West at Seneca Rocks, c. 1942, first ascents. 
 "Conn Course" or "Conncourse" (7 pitch) - Cannon Mountain, NH on August 3, 1945, first ascent.  This climb no longer exist due to exfoliation of this granite dome, but it shares some pitches with very popular Moby Grape route.
 "Mule Ear Peaks" - Big Bend National Park, 1940s, first ascent.
 "Dutch Girl" - Lost Mine Pinnacle,  Big Bend National Park, 1948, first ascent.
 "Finger Rock" - Santa Catalina Mountains, AZ. late 1940s, first ascent.
 "Great White Throne" - Zion National Park, 1949, third ascent

 "West Face" - Agathla Peak, Monument Valley, Arizona. First ascent of the peak was done on May 29, 1949 by Ray Garner, Herb Conn, and Lee Pedrick.

 "Soler" - Devils Tower in 1951. First ascent by Tony Soler, Art Lembeck, Herb Conn, Ray Moore, Chris Scordus
 Durrance Route - Devils Tower (June 1952): first female ascent by Jan Conn and Jane Showacre

 About 220 first ascents in the Black Hills Needles, including:
 "Conn Diagonal" (3 pitches), Outer Outlet. First ascent on August 26, 1953.

 "South Tower Conn Route" (2 pitches),Spire 4, Cathedral Spires. First ascent in June 8, 1953.

 "East Gruesome" (2 pitches),Spire 4, Cathedral Spires. First ascent on September 7, 1959.

Sources 

Publications by Conns
Conn, Herb. New Frontier for the Rock Climber. Appalachia XXVII: 158-163.
Conn, Herb (June 1953). The Needles in Review. Appalachia XXIX: 356-365. (PDF)

 (PDF)
Conn, Herb and Jan, A World Awaits Below. Unpublished draft: 93 p.
Conn, Jan and Herb (October 1956). Climbing Fun in the Needles, Summit (PDF)
Conn, Jan and Herb (September 1956). Devils Tower. Summit.
Conn, Jan and Herb (July 1957). The Ethics and Mountain Climbing, Summit (PDF)
Conn, Jan and Herb (November 1957). The versatile runner - Summit (PDF)
Conn, Jan and Herb (November 1957). We work in our spare time - Summit (PDF)
Conn, Herb (ca. 1957). Rock Climbs in the Needles: Black Hills of South Dakota, SAC. First guidebook to Needles. 
Conn, Herb (1958). Jam Crack Joe - Summit (PDF)
Conn, Herb and Jan (February 1959). The right piton when you need it - Summit (PDF)
Conn, Jan (September 1960). Balay Points to Ponder. Summit.
Conn, Herb and Jan (1964). Jewel Cave. National Speleological Society News: 72-73.
Conn, Herb. (1966). "Barometric Wind in Wind and Jewel Caves, South Dakota." National Speleological Society Bulletin 28 (2): 55-69. (Abstract)
Conn, Herb and Jan (1972). Report from Jewel Cave. National Speleological Society News: 85-92.

Conn, Herb and Jan (Jan. 1977). Chasing the Winds Through Jewel Cave. In Sloane, Bruce (ed.) Caver, Caves and Caving. Rutgers University Press, New Brunswick, NJ. 409 p.
Conn, Herb and Jan (1982). The Very Important Shortcut. National Speleological Society News: 300-302.
 

; Map
 Marriott, H.J., Jan and Herb Conn.  (2000). "Asplenium X alternifolium in the Black Hills of South Dakota".  American Fern Journal 90: 109.

Publications about Conns
Deal, D. E., 1977, "Climbers Turned Cavers," Summit, April–May, pp. 18–19 and 36.
Audubon, January 1989, p. 90-96 Following the Wind

References

External links 

Interview with Jan and Herb Conn by Charles Michael Ray, 14 December 2007, South Dakota Public Radio
, 10 October 2012, at the National Cathedral School For Girls
Video on climbing in Needles including interview with Jan Conn.
Herb Conn: Herb Conn, On-Line Encyclopedia of Integer Sequences

American rock climbers
American mountain climbers
American cavers
People from Custer, South Dakota